Shane Douglas Heal (born 6 September 1970) is an Australian basketball coach and former player.

Playing career

International
Heal's international career highlights include representing the Australian Boomers at the 1992, 1996, 2000 and 2004 Summer Olympic Games, captaining the team in 2004 in Athens. Heal Also represented Australia at numerous FIBA World Championships.

Many consider Heal's best international game came against the USA "Dream Team" in a warm up match for the 1996 Olympic Games in Atlanta. The game, played at the Delta Center in Salt Lake City, was won 118-77 by the US, though Heal topped all scorers with 28 points including hitting 8 of 12 three pointers. Heal had a running battle with NBA superstar Charles Barkley during the game with the two almost coming to blows at one point, though they hugged in mutual respect on-court after the game.

NBA
Heal had two stints in the NBA, firstly in the 1996–97 season with the Minnesota Timberwolves, when he averaged 1.7 points in 43 games, and secondly in the 2003–04 season with the San Antonio Spurs, when he averaged 3.7 points in six games.

NBL

Heal played for the Brisbane Bullets, Geelong Supercats, Sydney Kings, South Dragons and Gold Coast Blaze. He was a member of the Kings' 2003 NBL championship-winning team. Between 2006 and 2008, he served as player-coach of the Dragons. For the 2008–09 NBL season, Heal was part of the inaugural Blaze squad. He retired in February 2009 at age 38 after a 21-year career. In 440 games, he averaged 20.6 points and 6.1 assists.

Heal was named in the Sydney Kings 25th Anniversary Team.

NBL team records and achievements

Brisbane Bullets
2nd on three-pointers made (477)
2nd on assists (816)
4th on free-throw percentage (84.1%)
7th on points scored (2771)
7th on field goals made (951)
7th on free-throws made (392)
8th on steals (164)
6th on turnovers (387)

NBL league records
First in assists per game in 1990 (8.3/24 games)
First in assists per game in 2002 (7.5/29 games)
Third in most points in a game (61 in 1994)
Third in most assists in a game (20 in 1990)
Second and third in most three-pointers made in a game (12 in 1994 and 2001)

Australian Institute of Sport
He held an Australian Institute of Sport basketball scholarship from 1987 to 1988.

Coaching career

South Dragons
On 3 March 2006, it was reported in Melbourne's Herald Sun newspaper that Heal was considering coming out of retirement to captain the South Dragons, a new Melbourne-based NBL franchise to enter the league in the 2006–07 season. He officially signed with the team on 6 April as the Dragons' inaugural captain. On 23 October 2006, Dragons coach Mark Price resigned after the Dragons lost their first five regular season games. Price was replaced by Heal, who was appointed as player and interim coach for the remainder of the season. Heal took the club to the NBL playoffs in their first season, but then the team won just four of 26 games in 2007–08, including defeats in their last straight 13 matches. He was sacked by the Dragons on 1 February 2008.

Sydney Kings
On 24 February 2012, Heal was appointed head coach of the Sydney Kings for the rest of the 2011–12 NBL season. In his first game two days later, he guided the Kings to a 71–69 win over the Townsville Crocodiles.

Heal was named the Coach of the Month for January of the 2013–14 NBL season.

In March 2014, Heal parted ways with the Kings.

Wellington Saints
Heal coached the Wellington Saints during the 2014 New Zealand NBL season, and helped them win the championship in his one season.

South East Queensland
In March 2015, Heal was named the inaugural head coach of the South East Queensland Stars on a three-year deal. He was sacked in February 2016 when the team went into liquidation.

Sutherland Sharks
Heal coached the Sutherland Sharks women's team in the Waratah League for three years between 2018 and 2020. He guided them to a grand final appearance in his first year.

Sydney Uni Flames
In March 2021, Heal was appointed head coach of the Sydney Uni Flames on a three-year deal. He and his daughter left the Flames in January 2023 for reasons not publicly specified, and the departure is accompanied by an investigation from an independent firm.

Personal life
Heal's daughter, Shyla, is also a professional basketball player and has played on multiple teams where her father has been the coach.

Career statistics

NBA
Source

Regular season

|-
| align="left" | 
| align="left" | Minnesota
| 43 || 0 || 5.5 || .268 || .308 || .600 || .4 || .8 || .1 || .1 || 1.7
|-
| align="left" | 
| align="left" | San Antonio
| 6  || 0 || 12.0 || .292 || .222 || .800 || .7 || .8 || .2 || .0 || 3.7
|-
| style="text-align:left;"| Career
| style="text-align:left;"|
| 49 || 0 || 6.3 || .273 || .289 || .700 || .4 || .8 || .1 || .1 || 2.0

Playoffs

|-
| align="left" | 1997
| align="left" | Minnesota
| 2 || 0 || 1.5 || 1.000 || 1.000 || – || .0 || .5 || .0 || .0 || 3.0

References

External links

Profile at Basketball-Reference.com
NBL stats

1970 births
Living people
1998 FIBA World Championship players
Australian expatriate basketball people in Greece
Australian expatriate basketball people in the United States
Australian Institute of Sport basketball players
Australian men's basketball coaches
Australian men's basketball players
Basketball players at the 1992 Summer Olympics
Basketball players at the 1996 Summer Olympics
Basketball players at the 2000 Summer Olympics
Basketball players at the 2004 Summer Olympics
Basketball players from Melbourne
Brisbane Bullets players
Geelong Supercats players
Gold Coast Blaze players
Greek Basket League players
Makedonikos B.C. players
Minnesota Timberwolves players
National Basketball Association players from Australia
National Basketball League (Australia) coaches
Near East B.C. players
Olympic basketball players of Australia
People educated at Lake Ginninderra College
Player-coaches
Point guards
San Antonio Spurs players
South Dragons players
Sydney Kings coaches
Sydney Kings players
Undrafted National Basketball Association players
1994 FIBA World Championship players